Pacific Northwest '73–'74: Believe It If You Need It is a three-CD live album by the rock band the Grateful Dead.  It contains songs recorded at various concerts in the Pacific Northwest in 1973 and 1974.  It was released on September 7, 2018.  The songs on the album are excerpted from the 19-CD box set Pacific Northwest '73–'74: The Complete Recordings, which contains six complete shows and was released the same day.

Critical reception 
On AllMusic, Fred Thomas wrote, "Culled from several shows taking place in the Pacific Northwest on summer tours of 1973 and 1974, Believe It If You Need It zeroes in on the Grateful Dead in a particularly playful and comfortable phase, with the Deadhead-populated region and the Dead's first taste of financial success giving their playing in this time a more carefree fluidity.... "Playing in the Band" from a 5/21/74 performance at the University of Washington in Seattle is nothing short of epic, even for the Dead.... Even with the odd presentation and occasional performance issues, this set captures the Dead in what would be a short-lived period of playful release, grappling with both sadness and success through some of their most free and searching playing."

Track listing 

Notes

Personnel 
Grateful Dead
Jerry Garcia – guitar, vocals
Donna Jean Godchaux – vocals
Keith Godchaux – keyboards
Bill Kreutzmann – drums
Phil Lesh – bass, vocals
Bob Weir – guitar, vocals
Production
Produced by Grateful Dead
Produced for release by David Lemieux
Mastering: Jeffrey Norman
Recording: Rex Jackson (1973), Kidd Candelario (1974)
Original art: Roy Henry Vickers
Art direction: Roy Henry Vickers, Lisa Glines, Doran Tyson
Design: Lisa Glines
Photos: Richard Pechner
Liner notes: Jesse Jarnow

References 

Grateful Dead live albums
Rhino Records live albums
2018 live albums